The following elections occurred in the year 1898.

Asia
 March 1898 Japanese general election
 1898 Philippine Malolos Congress elections

Europe
 1898 Danish Folketing election
 1898 Danish Landsting election
 1898 French legislative election
 1898 German federal election

United Kingdom
 1898 South Norfolk by-election

North America

Canada
 1898 British Columbia general election
 1898 Edmonton municipal election
 1898 Northwest Territories general election
 1898 Ontario general election

United States
 United States House of Representatives elections in California, 1898
 1898 New York state election
 1898 Pennsylvania gubernatorial election
 United States House of Representatives elections in South Carolina, 1898
 1898 South Carolina gubernatorial election
 1898 United States House of Representatives elections
 1898 and 1899 United States Senate elections

Latin America
 1898 Argentine general election
 1898 Brazilian presidential election
 1898 Guatemalan presidential election

Oceania

New Zealand
 1898 City of Wellington by-election

See also
 :Category:1898 elections

1898
Elections